The Gadsden Mall is a regional  shopping mall on U.S. Route 411 (Rainbow Drive) in Gadsden, Alabama. Located at the interchange of Interstate 759 and U.S. Route 411, it is in the southern section of the city. It is anchored by Belk.

History
The site of the mall was historically knowns as the flats near Barrel Springs.

Site preparation for the mall, the first mall in Etowah County, began in September 1972, and construction started in March 1973.  Developed by Colonial Properties, the mall opened on July 31, 1974.  Sears and Belk Hudson opened as anchors at the mall, leaving their downtown locations, as did some other downtown merchants.

JCPenney had a store in the mall from 1991-2001, and returned in 2008 in a new anchor location created as part of a remodeling of the mall. On March 17, 2017, it was announced that JCPenney would be closing as part of a plan to close 138 stores nationwide. The store closed on July 31, 2017.

On October 15, 2018, it was announced that Sears would also be closing as part of a plan to close 142 stores nationwide which left Belk as the only anchor left.

Roy Moore
In November 2017, the mall became a subject of many news reports regarding U.S. Senate candidate Roy Moore who used to frequent the mall in the early 1980s and would approach teenage females for dates, leading to locals claiming that Moore had been "banned" from the mall though no formal ban has been proven.

References

External links
Gadsden Mall official website

Shopping malls established in 1974
Shopping malls in Alabama
Buildings and structures in Gadsden, Alabama
Tourist attractions in Etowah County, Alabama